The Other House (also referred to as the Upper House, House of Peers and House of Lords), established by the Lord Protector Oliver Cromwell under the terms of the Humble Petition and Advice, was one of the two chambers of the parliaments that legislated for England and Wales, Scotland, and Ireland, in 1658 and 1659, the final years of the Protectorate.



History
During the Rule of the Major-Generals and the selection of members for the Second Protectorate Parliament there was a firming of opinion that a second chamber was needed.

During the debate over the Humble Petition and Advice, the Lord Protector, Oliver Cromwell, and others wanted an upper chamber as a check on the power of the Lower House because he had found it difficult to control over the Naylor case. He pushed for a second chamber which would consist of nominated members who, in Thurloe's words, would be "a great security and a bulwark to the common interest". On 11 March 1656 the House of Commons passed a bill creating a second house which would consist of up to 70 members nominated by the Lord Protector.

On 6 May 1656 Cromwell rejected the title of King as proposed in the draft version of the Humble Petition, but accepted a reworded Humble Petition on 25 May. It included provisions for him as Lord Protector, tri-annual parliaments and an Other House of 40 to 70 members nominated for life by the Lord Protector, with a quorum of 21. Thus the second house became a fixture of the Protectorate, cemented in place by the Humble Petition and Advice, a new written constitution.

The Judges of the Upper Bench, who at this time were Warburton and Newdigate; of the Common Bench, Atkins, Hale, and Wyndham; with Barons of the Exchequer, Nicholas, Parker and Hill, were summoned as assistants to the second chamber.

All the peers but one (Lord Eure) summoned to attend this second chamber declined to sit, and to show his contempt for them, Sir Arthur Hesilrige took his seat in the Commons as member for Leicester. So, filling the second house proved more difficult than creating it. Of the 63 nominees only 42 accepted and only 37 came to the first meeting.

Matters were made worse when Parliament reconvened on 20 January 1658. Republicans in the lower house attempted to kill off the second house before a name for the chamber had been decided upon. After five days of debate with no agreement on whether it should be called the 'House of Lords' or the 'Other House', Cromwell addressed both houses warning them that such disagreements encouraged Royalists and threatened the country with a new civil war. Parliament was in no mood to heed his warning and continued to disagree among themselves, so on 4 February 1658 Cromwell dissolved Parliament.

After Oliver Cromwell's death in September 1658, those in the funeral procession who had noble titles under the ancient regime were so called (for example Edward, Earl of Manchester); those who had sat in Cromwell's Other House were called lord (for example Philip, Lord Skipton), but those such as "George Monck, General in Scotland", who had not taken up their seats in the Other House, were not referred to as lord.

The Third Protectorate Parliament (27 January 1659 – 22 April 1659) included a second chamber, but republicans in the House of Commons treated it with suspicion as they considered some of the members to be Presbyterians and closet Royalists. Parliament was soon deadlocked and was dissolved by Richard Cromwell, the new Lord Protector, on the advice of the Army, when it became clear that the Commons was seeking ways to disband the Army. With that dissolution the Other House, that had come into existence in 1656, never reconvened.

List of those nominated by Cromwell

See also
 Knights, baronets and peers of the Protectorate

Notes

References
 

.

Further reading
 A complete list of the members of the Other House with bibliographies.
 contemporary pamphlet written by a supporter of the Good Old Cause on the persons sitting in Cromwell's House of Lords.

A list of these will be found in vol. ii. of Noble's Memoirs of the Protectorate House of Cromwell.
For an exhaustive list of Cromwell's "Other House" or "House of Lords" see G. E. C.'s Complete Peerage, vol. ii. pp. 84–9.
For full particulars of Cromwellian baronets see G. E. C.'s Complete Baronetage, vol. iii. pp. 3 to 9.
The knights made by both the Protectors, Oliver and Richard, are enumerated in William Arthur Shaw's Knights of England vol. ii. pp. 223–4.
—  W.D. Pink, Lowton, Newton-le-Willows.
The MS. Journal of the Protectorate House of Lords, in possession of the late Sir Richard Tangye, was published this year for the first time in The House of Lords' Manuscripts, Vol. IV. (New Series), ... . This contains the lists of the different peers attending the meetings of Cromwell's House of Lords, with mention  also of the various offices held by them. — R. B. Upton.
There is a list of many of these persona (with armorial bearings) in Sir J. Prestwich's Respublica, 1787, at pp. 149 et seqq. — M.

Political history of England
Republicanism in England
17th-century English parliaments
1658 establishments in England
1659 disestablishments
1658 in England
1659 in England
Defunct upper houses
Other House
1650s disestablishments in England